Chryso (Greek: Χρύσω or Χρυσό) or Chrisso (Greek: Χρισσό) may refer to several places in Greece:

Chryso, Evrytania, a village in Evrytania, municipal unit Viniani
Chryso, Serres, a village in Serres regional unit, municipal unit Emmanouil Pappas
Chrisso, Phocis, a village in Phocis, municipality Delphi
Chryso Stamatopoulou, Greek singer and actress